Now Autumn 2006 is a compilation CD released by EMI Music Australia in 2006. Now Autumn 2006 is the 12th CD of the Australian Now! series. It peaked at #1 on the ARIA Compilations Chart. It has gone Gold selling over 35,000 copies.

Track listing
Bob Sinclar featuring Gary Pine – "Love Generation" (3:25)
The Veronicas – "Everything I'm Not" (3:23)
Gorillaz – "Dirty Harry" (3:48)
James Blunt – "Goodbye My Lover" (3:54)
Vandalism – "Never Say Never" (2:53)
Mylo vs. Miami Sound Machine – "Doctor Pressure" (3:25)
DHT featuring Edmée – "Listen to Your Heart" (3:13)
Coldplay – "Talk" (4:25)
Robbie Williams – "Advertising Space" (4:37)
Ricki-Lee – "Breathe" (3:26)
Yellowcard – "Lights and Sounds" (3:27)
The Living End – "What's on Your Radio" (3:00)
Pharrell featuring Gwen Stefani – "Can I Have It Like That" (3:56)
Paul Mac featuring Ngaiire – "It's Not Me, It's You" (3:37)
Fort Minor – "Believe Me" (3:47)
End of Fashion – "She's Love" (3:40)
Mattafix – "Big City Life" (3:55)
Fast Crew – "Suburbia Streets" (4:22)
Naughty Boy – "Phat Beach (I'll Be Ready)" (3:07)
Annie – "Chewing Gum" (3:27)
Tom Novy and Lima – "Take It" (3:36)

Chart performance

Sales

External links
 NOW Autumn 2006 @ Australian Charts

2006 compilation albums
EMI Records compilation albums
Warner Records compilation albums
Now That's What I Call Music! albums (Australian series)